Sinojohnstonia is a genus of flowering plants belonging to the family Boraginaceae.

It is native to China (within north-central, south-central, south-east and Inner Mongolia regions).

The genus name of Sinojohnstonia is in honour of Ivan Murray Johnston (1898–1960), a United States botanist. The Latin suffix of Sino- refers to sinensis meaning from China. It was first described and published in Bull. Fan Mem. Inst. Biol., Bot. Vol.7 on page 201 in 1936.

Known species
According to Kew:
Sinojohnstonia chekiangensis 
Sinojohnstonia moupinensis 
Sinojohnstonia plantaginea 
Sinojohnstonia ruhuaii

References

Boraginoideae
Boraginaceae genera
Plants described in 1936
Flora of China